Sheikh Abdulla Bin Rashid Al Mualla (Arabic: الشيخ عبدالله بن راشد المعلا; born 12 December 1971) is the deputy ruler of Umm Al Quwain emirate since April 2004,  He is the son of late Sheikh Rashid bin Ahmad Al Mualla.

Early life and education
Sheikh Abdullah Bin Rashid Al Mualla was born in the Emirate of Umm Al Quwain on December 12, 1971. He is the fifth son of Sheikh Rashid bin Ahmed Al-Mualla. Sheikh Abdullah Bin Rashid Al Mualla received his formal education in the United Arab Emirates and graduated from the Royal Military Academy Sandhurst in 1992 in the United Kingdom.

Career
After graduating he was appointed as the head of the police and public security in the emirate of Umm Al Quwain in 1997, and in 2004 issued by Sheikh Rashid bin Ahmed Al Mualla as Deputy Ruler of Umm Al Quwain till now. He is also a member of the UAE Supreme Council.

His reign as the deputy ruler has presented the emirate with groundbreaking projects such as Dreamland Aqua Park a  reconstruction of UAQ Marine Club, a master-planned waterfront project and a grand investment by Emaar Group International.
Dreamland Aqua Park was one of those. The vision of Sheikh Abdullah bin Rashid Al Mualla, deputy ruler of Umm Al Quwain, member of the UAE Supreme Council and ruler of the Umm Al Quwain emirate, the park was inaugurated on June 12, 1997. It was created with one main purpose: to be a place where “fun is a right for everyone!”.

He is the co-founder of Royal Europecoan Pediatric Clinic, 
along with his cousin Sheikh Hamad bin Abdulaziz Al Mualla. The Royal European Pediatric Clinic is open in the J3 Mall in Dubai, which provides seminars to parents to help them understand the learning difficulty and to look out for signs of the condition in their children.

See also
 List of alumni of the Royal Military Academy Sandhurst

References

1971 births
Living people